Brosch is a German surname. Notable people with the surname include:

Al Brosch (1911–1975), American golfer
Moritz Brosch (1829–1907), German historian
Rudolf Brosch, Austrian fencer
Tebor Brosch (born 1982), Canadian boxer
Yvonne Brosch, German actress and film director

German-language surnames